The 2020–21 FC St. Pauli season is the 110th season in the football club's history and 10th consecutive season in the second division of German football, the 2. Bundesliga and 28th overall. In addition to the domestic league, FC St. Pauli also are participating in this season's edition of the DFB-Pokal. This is the 58th season for FC St. Pauli in the Millerntor-Stadion, located in St. Pauli, Hamburg, Germany. The season covers a period from 1 July 2020 to 30 June 2021.

Players

Squad information

Transfers

Summer

In:

Out:

Winter

In:

Out:

Matches
Legend

Friendly matches

2. Bundesliga

League table

Results summary

Results by round

Results

DFB-Pokal

Squad and statistics

! colspan="13" style="background:#DCDCDC; text-align:center" | Players transferred or loaned out during the season
|-

|}

References

External links 
 FC St. Pauli (English)

FC St. Pauli seasons
St. Pauli